Chashmasor may refer to the following places in Tajikistan:

Chashmasor, Fayzobod District, a village and jamoat in Fayzobod District
Chashmasor, Ghafurov District, a jamoat in Ghafurov District
Chashmasor, Shahriston District, a village in Shahriston District